Huvina Hipparagi also Huvin Hipparagi is a Town in the southern state of Karnataka, India. It is located in the Basavana Bagevadi taluk of Vijayapura district in Karnataka.

Demographics

 India census, Huvinahippargi had a population of about 12000 with 7000 males and 5000 females.

Temples

Shree Guru Paramanad Temple, Shree Hanuman Temple, Shree kalikadevi Temples, Shree Lakkamma Devi Temple, Mallikarjuna Swamy Temple, Kalmeshwara Temple and Mouneshwar Temple, Patri Mata.

Mosques

One Darga and  maszid also is there for Muslim community. In every year there is a Moharam and Uras Of Dargah Syed Shah Noorullah Quadri Baghdadi in Agasbal and various  festivals are celebrated by both Hindu and Muslim religion.

Agriculture

Total land of village having more than 80% of well fertile and cropping area. The village mainly grows banana, grape, maize, sorghum, and small area of lemon, onion, turmeric, and Pomegranate. Irrigation is mainly based upon borewells and wells

Transportation

Huvina Hipparagi is connected to main town Bijapur via Muddebihal and Talikot. Its having many buses daily from Bijapur to Muddebihal and Talikot and vice versa.

It is major market hub for near by villages. The location of Huvina Hipparagi is very strategic & accessible by road. It is major junction to reach or divert the routes to Bijapur, Gulbarga, Talikot, Muddebihal, Basavan Bagewadi, Sindagi and Indi.

Education

Educational Institution
 Jss public School Govt Higher Primary School for Boys
 Govt Higher Primary School for Girls
 Govt Higher Primary School for Boys (Orphanage)
 Paramanand Higher Primary school Huvin Hipparagi
 Vishwa Chetan Kendra (V.C.K.) High School
 Shri M.G.Kori and Dr.B.G.Byakod P U College (Arts, Commerce & Education PU college with High School and Primary School Section)
 Ashirwad English medium primary school
 Shri Guru Paramanand Arts College
 Shri Guru Paramanand Fine Arts College
 Shri Guru Paramanand ITI College
 M.K iti college
 National ITI College
 Shri Sharada ITI CollegeComputer Education Param Institute of Computer TechnologyMain Agro Based BusinessShri Shivabasava Trading Company   Kudari Salawadagi Road
   Huvin Hipparagi
   
 Hostels'''

 Shri Gangamma Gangadarappa Hallur (Private) Hostel
 Backward Community of Manority (Govt) Hostel
 Paramanand Higher Primary school Huvin Hipparagi

Trusts

In village there are some associations doing cultural, sports programmes etc.
And In agasabal There Is A Great Sufi Saint Syed Shah Noorullah Quadri Baghdadi (RH). He Is The Grand Son Of Sheikh Sayyid Abdul Qadir Jilani 
Every Year The Urs Is Celebrated By Both Hindus And Muslims,

Festivals

The villagers are  mainly  celebrated Shri Paramanand Festival, Kara Hunnume, Nagara Panchami, Deepavli, Ugadi, Dassara in every year.
And Urs Of Mahboob Subhani Syed Shah Noorullah Quadri Agasbal Is Celebrated By Both Muslims and Hindus

See also

 Bijapur district
 Districts of Karnataka

References

External links
 http://Bijapur.nic.in/

Villages in Bijapur district, Karnataka